In enzymology, a hydroxymethylglutaryl-CoA reductase (NADPH) is an enzyme that catalyzes the chemical reaction

(R)-mevalonate + CoA + 2 NADP+  (S)-3-hydroxy-3-methylglutaryl-CoA + 2 NADPH + 2 H+

The 3 substrates of this enzyme are (R)-mevalonate, CoA, and NADP+, whereas its 3 products are (S)-3-hydroxy-3-methylglutaryl-CoA, NADPH, and H+.

This enzyme belongs to the family of oxidoreductases, to be specific those acting on the CH-OH group of donor with NAD+ or NADP+ as acceptor. This enzyme participates in biosynthesis of steroids including cholesterol. The statin class of anticholesterol drugs act through inhibiting this enzyme.

Nomenclature 

The systematic name of this enzyme class is (R)-mevalonate:NADP+ oxidoreductase (CoA-acylating). Other names in common use include:
 hydroxymethylglutaryl coenzyme A reductase (reduced nicotinamide
 adenine dinucleotide phosphate), 3-hydroxy-3-methylglutaryl-CoA reductase
 β-hydroxy-β-methylglutaryl coenzyme A reductase
 hydroxymethylglutaryl CoA reductase (NADPH)
 S-3-hydroxy-3-methylglutaryl-CoA reductase
 NADPH-hydroxymethylglutaryl-CoA reductase
 HMGCoA reductase-mevalonate:NADP-oxidoreductase (acetylating-CoA)
 3-hydroxy-3-methylglutaryl CoA reductase (NADPH)
 hydroxymethylglutaryl-CoA reductase (NADPH2).

Structural studies

References

 
 
 

EC 1.1.1
NADPH-dependent enzymes
Enzymes of known structure